Acanthococcus is a genus of true bugs belonging to the family Eriococcidae.

The species of this genus are found in Southern America.

Species:

Acanthococcus aceris 
Acanthococcus adenostomae 
Acanthococcus diversispinus
Acanthococcus gracielae
Acanthococcus haywardi
Acanthococcus podhalensis 
Acanthococcus punctatae
Acanthococcus riojensis
Acanthococcus siambonensis

References

Eriococcidae